The 2020 Ettan, part of the 2020 Swedish football season is the 15th season of Sweden's third-tier football league in its current format. The season started on 14 June 2020 and ended on 29 November 2020.

Teams
32 teams contest the league divided into two divisions, Norra and Södra. 22 returning from the 2019 season, three relegated from Superettan and seven promoted from Division 2. The champion of each division will qualify directly for promotion to Superettan, while the two runners-up compete in a play-off against the thirteenth and fourteenth teams from Superettan to decide who will play in the 2021 Superettan. The bottom three teams in each division will qualify directly for relegation to Division 2, while the two thirteenth-placed teams play against each other while the top two runners-up from Division 2 play against each other to decide who will play in 2021 Ettan.

Norra

Södra

League tables

Norra

Södra

Results

Relegation play-offs
The 13th-placed teams of each division meet each other, and the best two runners-up from 2020 Division 2 meet each other, in two-legged ties on a home-and-away basis. The winners of each matchup qualify for the 2021 Division 1.

3–3 on aggregate. Västra Frölunda IF won on away goals and are promoted to Division 1.

Lunds BK won 3–1 on aggregate.

Season statistics

Top scorers - Norra

Top scorers - Södra

References

2020 in Swedish association football leagues
2020–21 in European third tier association football leagues